John Harold Vick Sutcliffe  (born 30 April 1931) is a former British Conservative Party politician.

Sutcliffe's father was Sir Harold Sutcliffe, Member of Parliament (MP) for Royton (1931–1950) and Heywood and Royton (1950–1955). He was educated at Winchester College and New College, Oxford. He was called to the Bar, member of Inner Temple, in 1956.

John was the third child of Sir Harold Sutcliffe. His siblings were Anne Theodora (born 1928), Betty (born 1929), and younger sister Jennifer Mary (born 1933). His mother was Emily Theodora Cochrane (known as Theo.) His parents divorced in 1947, and his father (badly gassed in World War I) died in 1958.

Sutcliffe contested Oldham West in 1959, Chorley, Lancashire, in 1964 and Middlesbrough West in 1966. He was Member of Parliament (MP) for Middlesbrough West from 1970 to 1974 narrowly winning the seat by some 380 votes from Jeremy Bray. After boundary changes, he stood as candidate in Teesside Thornaby in February and October 1974, but lost to Labour candidate Ian Wrigglesworth. Sutcliffe has not been elected an MP since.

A company director, he served on North Housing Association 1977–94 Chairman from 1986, Board of Housing Corporation 1982–88, Board of Teesside Development Corporation 1987–1998, Director then Chairman N.E.Civic Trust 1976–88, Chairman of the Northern Heritage Trust 1981–88 and member of the North York Moors National Park committee 1982–88.

In 1994 he was appointed CBE for his services to housing and conservation. High Sheriff of North Yorkshire 1987–1988, Deputy Lieutenant North Yorkshire.

References 
Times Guide to the House of Commons, 1966 and October 1974

External links 

1931 births
Living people
Conservative Party (UK) MPs for English constituencies
Alumni of New College, Oxford
UK MPs 1970–1974
People educated at Winchester College
Commanders of the Order of the British Empire
Members of the Inner Temple